"Where Did the Feeling Go?" is a song composed by Norman Saleet. It was first recorded by American singer Jill Michaels in 1985, and later by Russell Hitchcock (lead singer of the band Air Supply) for his 1988 debut solo album.

American singer Selena recorded the song in 1989 and in 1991, performed the song at the Tejano Music Awards and on her Ven Conmigo Tour. Selena's version of the song was later remixed with a new live string arrangement by Selena y Los Dinos keyboardist Ricky Vela and posthumously released on the soundtrack album for the 1997 film Selena and later included as a bonus track on the "20 Years of Music" version of Selena's 1992 album Entre a Mi Mundo, which was released by EMI Records in 2002.

Puerto Rican singer Millie Corretjer recorded the song in Spanish with the title "Donde te has ido amor". It appears on her 1995 album Sola.

References

1985 songs
1985 singles
1997 singles
Russell Hitchcock songs
Selena songs
Songs released posthumously
EMI Records singles
Scotti Brothers Records singles
Songs written by Norman Saleet
Song recordings produced by A. B. Quintanilla
Pop ballads